Senator Winchester may refer to:

Boyd Winchester (1836–1923), Kentucky State Senate
James Winchester (1752–1826), Tennessee State Senate